Avax Technologies, Inc is a Philadelphia-based biotechnology company whose most advanced product candidate is MVax for melanoma. MVax is a cancer vaccine that received a Special Protocol Assessment agreement with the FDA in October 2006, and subsequently began a Phase III registration clinical trial in November 2007. In previous studies, MVax demonstrated a 5-year overall survival rate (OS)of 44% and response rate of 35% (13% CR, 22% PR).

AC Vaccine

Method
A tumor sample is removed from a patient, then treated with the hapten 2,4-Dinitrophenol. When reinjected back into the patient, the hapten will cause an enhanced immune response against the cancer cells.

Product Candidates

MVax
Started May 2007. Currently in a Phase III trial for Stage IV Melanoma.

MVax’s Phase II response rate of 35% (CR + PR) in combination with low-dose IL-2 compares favorably to the Phase II results of other melanoma cancer vaccines such as Vical’s Allovectin-7 (11% CR + PR) and BioVex’s OncoVex (28% CR + PR), both of which are given as stand alone therapy.

Due to the Financial crisis of 2007–2010 and recent cancer vaccine failures in other companies like Favrille and Cell Genesys, Avax has had trouble attracting investors. In an effort to conserve cash, enrollment for the Phase III trial was suspended on March 26, 2009, but the trial itself is still ongoing. However on December 16, 2009, the company obtained bridge financing in the amount of $1,400,000. This will be used to conduct an interim analysis of the Phase III data for MVax. CEO John Prendergast notes: "Recent and anticipated news by companies involved with cancer vaccines and immunotherapies has resulted in renewed interest in the sector by institutional investors, larger pharma, biotechnology companies and the medical and scientific communities at large.".

LVax
Started February 2006. Currently in a Phase I/II trial for NSCLC. No new patient enrollment until more funding is obtained.

OVax
Started April 2008, a Phase I/II trial for ovarian cancer. Encouraging results reported Feb 2016. Median survival was 22.7 months with no treatment-related serious adverse events.

Genopoietic SA
Based in Lyon, France, has a GMP facility that manufactures the vaccines for Avax. The facility is certified by the French government for commercial and clinical vaccine production for the European markets.

See also
Dendreon
Cancer vaccine

Notes

External links
 AVXT Facebook fan page (has a discussion about the company)

Companies traded over-the-counter in the United States
Biotechnology companies of the United States
Companies based in Philadelphia
Pharmaceutical companies of the United States
Life sciences industry
Companies with year of establishment missing
Health care companies based in Pennsylvania